Gero Clemens Hocker (born 30 June 1975) is a German economist and politician of the Free Democratic Party (FDP) who has been serving as a member of the Bundestag from the state of Lower Saxony since 2017.

Early life and career 
Hocker graduated from high school in 1994 and subsequently completed his basic military service. From 1995 to 1998 he trained as a bank clerk at the Sparkasse Bremen. 

After his training, Hocker worked in the marketing department. He also studied economics at the University of Bremen from 1998 to 2003. During his studies he completed various internships in Australia, China and New York. He then worked as an investment consultant at Nordwestfinanz Bremen until 2006. From 2007 until 2008, he was a personal advisor to Carsten Maschmeyer.

Political career

Career in state politics 
From 2009 to 2017 Hocker served as a member of the State Parliament of Lower Saxony. From 2012 to 2018 he was Secretary General of the FDP Lower Saxony, under the leadership of chairman Stefan Birkner. In April 2018 he was elected to the state executive committee as an assessor.

Member of the German Parliament, 2017–present 
In the 2017 federal election, Hocker ran for election in the Osterholz - Verden constituency and was elected to the Bundestag via the FDP's Lower Saxony state list. He is the spokesman for agriculture and nutrition of the FDP parliamentary group in the Bundestag.  

On 17 January 2019 he was elected President of the German Fisheries Association.  

In the negotiations to form a so-called traffic light coalition of the Social Democratic Party (SPD), the Green Party and the FDP following the 2021 German elections, Hocker was part of his party's delegation in the working group on agriculture and nutrition, co-chaired by Till Backhaus, Renate Künast and Carina Konrad.

In 2023, Hocker was one of the candidates to succeed Stefan Birkner as chair of the FDP in Lower Saxony; in an internal vote at a party convention, he ultimately lost against Konstantin Kuhle.

Other activities
 Nuclear Waste Disposal Fund (KENFO), Alternate Member of the Board of Trustees (since 2022)
 St Barbara Foundation, Member of the Board of Trustees

References

External links 

  
 Bundestag biography 
 

 

 

1975 births
Living people
Members of the Bundestag for Lower Saxony
Members of the Bundestag 2021–2025
Members of the Bundestag 2017–2021
Members of the Bundestag for the Free Democratic Party (Germany)